The Hunton Group is a stratigraphic group in Oklahoma. It preserves fossils dating back to the Devonian period.

See also

 List of fossiliferous stratigraphic units in Oklahoma
 Paleontology in Oklahoma

References

 

Devonian geology of Oklahoma